The Park Is Mine is a Canadian-American drama television film  based on the novel of the same name by Stephen Peters. The film focuses on Vietnam War veteran, Mitch (Tommy Lee Jones), who takes forceful control of Central Park to remember those who served and died in the Vietnam War and draw attention to veterans' issues.

Plot
A vietnam vet (Tommy Lee Jones) takes forceful control of Central Park to remember those who served and died in the Vietnam War.

Cast
 Tommy Lee Jones as Mitch Garnett
 Helen Shaver as Valery
 Yaphet Kotto as Eubanks
 Lawrence Dane as Commissioner Keller
 Peter Dvorsky as Dix
 Eric Peterson as Mike Johnson
 Gale Garnett as Rachel
 Denis Simpson as Richie
 Reg Dreger as Commander Curran
 Louis Di Bianco as Captain Juliano
 Carl Marotte as Santini
 Dennis O'Connor (actor) as Sergeant Duffy
 Tom Harvey as General Bryant
 R. D. Reid as Policeman on Ledge
 George Bloomfield as Dr. Mueller
 Marvin Karon as Warburton
 Jong Soo Park as Tran Chan Dinh
 Peter Langley as Verdanken
 Robert Windsor as Minister
 Stewart Arnott as Newsman – V.A. Hospital
 Jennifer Dean as Detective Balkan
 Andrew Thomson as Transmission Officer
 Allan Aarons as Policeman – V.A. Hospital
 James Kidnie as Policeman in Park
 Michael Copeman as Man at Desk
 Philip Akin as Hardy
 Ardon Bess as Daniels
 Gregory Francis Kruger as T-shirt haggler
 Jay Thomas as TV reporter

Home media
The film was released in 1985 on VHS by Key Video. It had originally been released on DVD overseas, but not in the United States, except for bootlegs. However, on December 13, 2016, Kino Lorber released the first official Blu-ray Disc and DVD.

Soundtrack

The Park Is Mine is the sixteenth soundtrack album released by Tangerine Dream and their forty-second released album overall. It was recorded in 1985 but not released until 1991. All tracks were composed by Edgar Froese, Christoph Franke, and Johannes Schmoelling.

References

External links

1986 television films
1986 action films
English-language Canadian films
Canadian television films
Films directed by Steven Hilliard Stern
Park Is Mine 1986
20th Century Fox Television films
Films produced by John Kemeny
Films scored by Tangerine Dream
Films set in Manhattan
HBO Films films
1980s Canadian films